José Pablo Neris Figueredo (born 13 March 2000) is a Uruguayan footballer who plays as a forward for the Primera División club Club Atlético Colón.

References

2000 births
Living people
Uruguayan footballers
Uruguay youth international footballers
Uruguayan Primera División players
Club Atlético River Plate (Montevideo) players
Association football midfielders